The Irrum Manzil Metro Station is a station of the Hyderabad Metro.

Etymology

It was named after Errum Manzil, a historic palace located near the station.

History 
It was opened in 2017.

Facilities 
The station has a skywalk which leads to the Next Galleria Mall.

References

External links
Page on Hyderabad Metro website

Hyderabad Metro stations